Charles Winters was an American businessman.

Charles Winters may also refer to:

Chuck Winters (born 1974), former Canadian Football League linebacker and defensive back

See also
Charles Winter (disambiguation)